Statistics of the Scottish Football League in season 1913–14.

Scottish League Division One

Scottish League Division Two

See also
1913–14 in Scottish football

References

 
1913-14